Marai may refer to
Marai (name)
Marai no Tora, a 1943 Japanese film 
Marai Parai, a plateau in Malaysia 
Damhi Marai, a village in Nepal

See also
Marais (disambiguation)
Marei (disambiguation)